The Shenmu–Yan'an railway or Shenyan railway, is a railroad in Shaanxi Province of China between Shenmu and Yan'an. Major cities and towns along route include Shenmu, Yulin, Hengshan, Mizhi, Suide, Zizhou, Qingjian, Zichang County, Baota and Yan'an.

The Shenyan line forms part of the Baotou–Liuzhou rail corridor and was built with partial financing through a $200 million development assistance loan from the Asia Development Bank.

Rail connections
 Suide: Taiyuan–Zhongwei–Yinchuan railway
 Yan'an: Xi'an–Yan'an railway

See also

 List of railways in China

References

Railway lines in China
Rail transport in Shaanxi
Railway lines opened in 2001